The North Carolina General Assembly of 1782 was the state legislature that first convened in Hillsborough, North Carolina, on April 15, 1782, and concluded on May 18, 1782. Members of the North Carolina Senate and the North Carolina House of Commons were elected by eligible North Carolina voters.

The General Assembly elected Alexander Martin of Guilford County as Governor on April 26, 1782.  James Glasgow was Secretary of State.  James Iredell was Attorney General.  There  was no Lieutenant Governor of North Carolina until 1868.

Councilors of State

The General Assembly elected the following Councilors of State on May 3, 1782:
 Richard Henderson of Granville County 
 Allen Jones of Northampton County
 Spruce Macay of Rowan County
 Philemon Hawkins II of Granville County
 Griffith Rutherford of Rowan County
 Benjamin Seawell of Franklin County
 John Penn of Granville

Members

There was one Senator and two members of the House of Commons for each of the 50 counties.  In addition, each of the six districts had one representative each.

The House of Commons leadership and staff included:  Thomas Benbury, Speaker; John Hunt, Clerk; and Lovett Burgess Assistant Clerk.

Legislation
This General Assembly met during the midst of the American Revolution.   Many of the session laws that they passed dealt with the war.  Other laws dealt with taxes, setting up judiciaries, chartering towns, and regulating rivers and forests.

Notes

References

1782
General Assembly
 1782
 1782